Frank Mackenzie Ross  (April 19, 1891 in Glasgow, Scotland – December 11, 1971 in Vancouver) was the 19th Lieutenant Governor of British Columbia.

Ross was the son of Grace Archibald (McCrone) and David Ross. Ross’ first job was as a bank clerk in Montreal in 1910. He joined the Canadian Expeditionary Force at the outbreak of World War I, serving with the 8th Battalion. During the war, Ross received the Military Cross and was a captain by the war's end.

After the war, Ross joined a shipbuilding company in Saint John, New Brunswick. From this start, Ross went on to careers in industry and finance.

On 3 July 1923 Ross married Gertrude Edith Tomalin, a well-known reciter and entertainer, at the Savoy Chapel. She died in hospital at Saint John, New Brunswick on 22 January 1940, aged 58.

During World War II, Ross assisted in Ottawa procuring supplies for the British Admiralty. His wartime service earned Ross the C.M.G. In 1945 Ross married Phyllis Turner, whose son John Turner later became Prime Minister of Canada.

Ross was appointed as Lieutenant Governor on October 3, 1955. During Ross’ term, a fire destroyed Government House. A new Government House was completed in May 1959, the year before Ross retired from the office of Lieutenant Governor. With all of the furnishings destroyed, Frank Ross and his wife, Phyllis, went to the United Kingdom in search of suitable pieces. The Rosses purchased 114 pieces of furniture, which they donated to the new Government House.

References

Sources

External links
 Biography on Lieutenant-Governor of British Columbia official website

1891 births
1971 deaths
Lieutenant Governors of British Columbia
Canadian military personnel of World War I
Royal Winnipeg Rifles officers
Canadian recipients of the Military Cross
Scottish emigrants to Canada
Canadian Companions of the Order of St Michael and St George
Canadian Expeditionary Force officers